WBXZ-LD, virtual channel 56 (UHF digital channel 23), is a low-powered television station licensed to Buffalo, New York. The station is owned by Steven Ritchie. The station airs Cozi TV on its main channel; its local programming is instead carried on the fourth digital subchannel, branded as Throwback Television.

History
The station broadcast on channel 56 analog until it had to vacate that frequency when the Federal Communications Commission (FCC) removed it from the broadcast spectrum. It used to be an affiliate of The Box, from which the station gets its call sign. The station is owned by Steven Ritchie, a local retired police officer who acquired the station from Craig Fox in December 2013.

After the digital transition, the station moved from analog channel 56 to channel 17 (the channel had been held by WBUF-TV from 1953 to 1958 and PBS member station WNED-TV from 1959 to 2009) through a Special Temporary Authority approved by the FCC. (In the spectrum reallocation, it moved up to physical channel 23, previously occupied by WNLO and WPXJ.) The station returned to virtual channel 56 upon digital conversion, at which point it also planned to add several digital subchannels from Luken Communications, among them being Retro Television Network, PBJ and Heartland. WBXZ-LP returned to the air on April 17, 2014 with test programming; on May 2, the station indicated it was having trouble securing a carriage agreement with Luken (mainly because Ritchie could not fit the necessary large satellite dish onto the One Seneca Center where the station's transmitter is located but also in part due to Luken's financial problems) and was seeking other options. As of 2014, the station was carrying Cozi TV on 56.1 and "Throwback TV" (a locally programmed outlet) is carried on 56.2 (later moved to 56.4). Retro and a new Luken subchannel known as Rev'n would be added to WBXZ-LP on December 1, 2014. Buzzr would be added shortly after that network's launch.

Luken's networks, along with Buzzr, were pulled from WBXZ-LP on June 28, 2016 after technical difficulties. Ebru TV and AMGTV were briefly added as replacements; both have since been removed. With the exception of Cozi and the returning Tuff TV (which was re-added after it split from Luken). Retro (but not any of the other Luken networks) was re-added in July 2017; Tuff TV was dropped later that year.

In February 2018, Buzzr was added back to the list of subchannels. Jewelry Television was added shortly thereafter, with the station signing on with NewsNet, an upstart news network, when it launched in fall 2018, bringing the number of subchannels to 11. With Tuff TV ceasing operations in August 2018, Rev'n was re-added; Rev'n was dropped in August 2020 in favor of the returning AMGTV. WBXZ-LP began showing This TV in September 2019, taking over the affiliation from rimshot WVTT.

Digital channels
The station's digital signal is multiplexed:

56.4 and 56.9 are locally programmed.

Throwback Television
"Throwback Television" is the brand used for the 56.4 subchannel. It serves as the channel's flagship service, programmed by Ritchie with programming including independent regional pro wrestling, the locally produced science-fiction series Captain Isotope and the Enemy of Space, and an assortment of hosted movie shows, shows and films in the public domain, infomercials, and low-cost/barter syndicated fare.

References

External links
WBXZ-LD Official website
 
 FCCinfo.com information on WBXZ-LD
 

BXZ-LD
Low-power television stations in the United States
Buzzr affiliates
Cozi TV affiliates
NewsNet affiliates